Charles Hitchcock Sherrill (April 13, 1867 in Washington, DC, United States – June 25, 1936 in Paris, France) was an American politician, diplomat, sport officer, and author.

Early life and career
His parents were New York lobbyist and state politician Charles H. Sherrill and Sarah Fulton (Wynkoop) Sherrill. He studied at Yale University, was called to the New York State Bar and became a New York City lawyer.

During World War I, he served as a brigadier general and an adjutant general with the New York National Guard.

He was appointed as US Minister to Argentina from 1909 to 1910 and served an important role in securing the contracts for two  battleships during the South American dreadnought race, and US Ambassador to Turkey from 1932 to 1933.

Support for dictators
Shortly after retiring from public office Sherrill proclaimed his admiration for Europe's strong men and predicted the end of parliamentary form of government, which he dubbed "inept" and referred to as "so-called democracy." In a long letter to the editors of The New York Times, published on June 4, 1933, he singled out Benito Mussolini, the fascist dictator of Italy, for praise and spoke of the "amazing betterment" of life accomplished by his régime. He wrote of Adolf Hitler, the new leader of Germany, "Whether one admires [him] or not, at least he is a leader who leads." Soon enough, he wrote, "people the world over... will follow courageous leaders."

1936 Olympics
In 1935, during the preparations for the 1936 Olympic Games, Sherrill met twice with Hitler. A modern historian wrote that Sherrill was "mesmerized by the
force of Hitler's personality and charisma." In his one-hour talk with Hitler, Sherrill insisted for at least one token Jew to be included in the German team for the Olympic Winter and another for the Olympic Summer Games. Hitler refused and when he was threatened by Sherrill with an American boycott, promised purely German Olympic Games. Sherrill sent the information to the IOC president, Henri de Baillet-Latour, who did not insist on Jewish participation on the German teams. After the Nuremberg Racial Laws, only Half-Jews, with no more than two of the four grandparents being racially Jewish, were still permitted to represent Germany. With Theodor Lewald as President of the Organizing Committee for the Summer Games, Rudi Ball (hockey, Winter Games) and Helene Mayer (Fencing, Summer Games), three Half Jews calmed world public opinion.

Sports
Sherrill was a successful athlete during his studies at Yale University and won inter-collegiate 100-yard dash titles four times in a row and 220 yards three times. In 1888, he used crouch start for the first time in track and field sprints. From 1922 to his death, he was an important member of the International Olympic Committee and played vital role in organizing the 1932 Summer Olympics, in Los Angeles, and calming American public opinion on the 1936 Summer Olympics, in Berlin.

Author
He wrote twenty-two books, especially on stained glass windows in European churches and European and world politics.

References

External links
 
 

1867 births
1936 deaths
Ambassadors of the United States to Turkey
Ambassadors of the United States to Argentina
International Olympic Committee members
Yale University alumni
American male sprinters
American expatriates in France
20th-century American diplomats
Military personnel from Washington, D.C.
Lawyers from New York City